Catabrosa aquatica, called brookgrass, water whorl-grass, water whirlgrass and water hairgrass, is widespread species of semi-aquatic grass in the genus Catabrosa, native to the most of the non-tropical northern hemisphere, and to southern Chile and Argentina. As its scientific and common names suggest, it prefers to grow in wet areas, such as meadows, stream banks and lake shores.

References

Pooideae
Plants described in 1812
Flora of Malta